Scissurella staminea is a species of minute sea snail, a marine gastropod mollusk or micromollusk in the family Scissurellidae, the little slit snails.

Description
The shell grows to a height of 2 mm.
The depressed shell has an ovate shape. The spire is plane. The umbilicus is moderate. The two whorls are nearly plane. They are broadly clathrate with thread-like elevated radiating lines, stronger below the carina, and concentric elevated striae. The umbilical region
has elevated concentric lines. The aperture is rounded-ovate. The inner lip is receding.

This species is widely clathrate, with conspicuous thread-like radiating and concentric lines, the former of which assume on the spire a lamellar character.

Distribution
This species occurs in the Western Pacific Ocean.

References

 Higo, S., Callomon, P. & Goto, Y. (1999). Catalogue and bibliography of the marine shell-bearing Mollusca of Japan. Osaka. : Elle Scientific Publications. 749 pp.

External links
 To Encyclopedia of Life
 To World Register of Marine Species
 

Scissurellidae
Gastropods described in 1862